Noah von Williamsburg (20 April 1539 – unknown) was a minor German noble and skilled fencer. He is known for beating famous German artist Thomas Schweicker in a duel that cost the artist both arms.

Early life 
Von Williamsburg was born in the small town of Judenburg Austria to Johannes von Williamsburg and Eva Graf. His father Johannes von Williamsburg was a noble and landowner around the town. His mother was his father's second wife after his first wife died from an unknown illness.

Von Williamsburg moved with his family to the German town of Schwäbisch Hall in 1544 after a small fire damaged a portion of his family's estate.

Duel 
In 1561, von Williamsburg challenged German artist Thomas Schweicker to a duel over a female named Kirsten Engel that both wanted to court. Schweicker was unaware of von Williamsburg's aptitude with swordfighting and was swiftly defeated. Schweicker lost both arms during the duel and was left for dead, but was brought back to Schwäbisch Hall by spectators where a doctor cauterized his wounds and saved his life. Decades after the duel, Schweicker apologized to von Williamsburg. The two reconciled and became good friends. After Schweicker's death in October of 1602, von Williamsburg was distraught. He attended Schweiker's funeral and burial, and paid for the expenses and burial plot.

Personal life 
Days after his duel with Schweicker, von Williamsburg proposed to Kirsten Engel and the two wedded several months later. Von Williamsburg's father Johannes paid for the construction of a small estate in the countryside surrounding Schwäbisch Hall which was completed the following winter. In February of 1564, the couple's son Wilhelm was born. After his father Johannes fell ill in the fall of 1582, Noah von Williamsburg became the lord. On February 8, 1583, Johannes von Williamsburg died from an unknown illness. Historians speculate that the illness was a cancer of the lungs known as small-cell carcinoma.

References 

 Eraji, Mohamed. "Mouth and Foot Painting". artyadshq. Shanghai Tongo. Retrieved 16 September 2018.
 Gordon McLachian "The Rough Guide to Germany" pg.265. Retrieved 18 September 2018.
 "The ideals of Nobility and Royalty". Retrieved September 18, 2018.

1539 births
Year of death unknown
German fencers
German nobility